is a Japanese voice actress best known for voicing Frau Bow in the original Mobile Suit Gundam. She is a member of 81 Produce.

Filmography
The Babysitter in Stitch! ~Best Friends Forever~ (2010)
Pepper in Urusei Yatsura (xxxx)
Miyuki Tokita in Brigadoon: Marin & Melan (xxxx)
Shihoko Kishida in Darker than Black (xxxx)
Akiko Yanagi in Sailor Moon (1992)
Izumi Sano in Detective Conan (xxxx)
Frau Bow in Mobile Suit Gundam (1979)
Kitty Kitten in Space Runaway Ideon (1980)
Princess Fala (Allura) in Golion (1981)
Rose in Six God Combination Godmars (1981)
Tetsuo in Miss Machiko (1981)
Ester in Tales of Little Women (1987)
Yoneta-sensei in Fair, then Partly Piggy (1988)

Dubbing
Coming to America, Lisa McDowell (Shari Headley)
The Dark Knight, Barbara Gordon (Melinda McGraw)

References

External links
 

1958 births
81 Produce voice actors
Japanese voice actresses
Living people
Voice actresses from Fukuoka Prefecture